Nachikulam is a village administered by the Udayamarthandapuram Panchayath in Thiruvarur district in the Indian state of Tamil Nadu. It is the main line in the East Coast Road. It is also a part of Muthupet.

Demographics
Nachikulam has a population of roughly 2000 people. Tamil is the local language spoken there.

Geography
Nachikulam is situated in the southern part of Cauvery delta, between Thiruthuraipoondi and Pattukkottai, and is about around 350 km from Chennai. Muthupet is the near by town, about 9 km distant.

Udayamarthandapuram Bird Sanctuary is situated in Nachikulam. Thousands of birds from all around the world can be seen . It is a major tourist spot in Thiruvarur district.

Religion
People follow Islam and Hinduism beliefs. Nachikulam has more than 3 Hindu temples and 4 mosques.

Economics
Agriculture is the main source of income, although some residents commute to other places for work.

Transport
The East Coast Road (ECR) from Chennai to Kanyakumari district connects this village as well. Frequent Bus services are available to nearby towns Nagapattinam(58km), Thiruthuraipoondi(16km) and Pattukkottai (26km).

Nachikulam has a railway station near the ECR called Thillaivilagam. Thillaivilagam Railway Station is on the Karaikkudi-Thiruvarur broadguage line. Thiruvarur-Karaikudi-Thiruvarur Demo rail Service runs daily except Sunday. Ernakulam - Velankanni - Ernakulam express also operates on Sunday only, but does not stop at Thillaivilagam. No direct trains connect Chennai to Thillaivilagam.

Tiruchirappalli International Airport is the nearest airport (120 km).

Infrastructure
Nachikulam has a small bazaar with more than 50 shops, Bharat Petroleum Punk, 2 marriage halls and a mobile phone network, DBS Bank, 4 ATMs (DBS, State Bank of India, India 1, Hitachi) are available.

Education
A Govt. higher secondary school, Millennium Matriculation school, and a Govt. library are in the village.

References 

Villages in Tiruvarur district